The former Live Oak County Jail  is located in Oakville in the U.S. state of Texas. It was added to the National Register of Historic Places in 2004.  Built in 1887 by Diebold Lock and Safe Company, the native sandstone structure was the county jail until 1919. The structure is currently in private ownership.

See also

National Register of Historic Places listings in Live Oak County, Texas
Recorded Texas Historic Landmarks in Live Oak County

References

External links

Government buildings completed in 1887
Buildings and structures in Live Oak County, Texas
Jails on the National Register of Historic Places in Texas
National Register of Historic Places in Live Oak County, Texas
Recorded Texas Historic Landmarks